Trnovlje pri Celju is a settlement in the City Municipality of Celje in eastern Slovenia. It lies in the northeastern suburbs of Celje itself. The area is part of the traditional region of Styria. It is now included with the rest of the municipality in the Savinja Statistical Region.

Name
The name of the settlement was changed from Trnovlje to Trnovlje pri Celju in 1953.

References

External links

Trnovlje pri Celju on Geopedia

Populated places in the City Municipality of Celje